Patrick Topaloff (30 December 1944 – 7 March 2010) was a French comedian, singer, and actor.

The son of a Georgian father and a Corsican mother which, according to him, made him "a delicate Franco-Russian dessert", Topaloff began his career on Europe 1, where his comic antics drew a wide audience, especially among children who delighted in his many silly catch phrases. Popular singer Claude François encouraged him to try his hand at singing, and his recording of "Il Vaut Bien Mieux Etre Jeune, Riche et Beau" ("It's Much Better to Be Young, Rich, and Beautiful") became a major hit and the first of several gold records.

In the late 1960s and throughout the 1970s, writer/director Philippe Clair cast Topaloff in a number of slapstick comedy films similar to the Carry On series in the UK or those made by Jerry Lewis in the US after splitting with Dean Martin. His last feature film was Drôles de Zèbres for writer/director Guy Lux in 1977.

In his later years, problems in Topaloff's private life overshadowed his professional successes. Deeply in debt, he frequently worked without billing in an effort to avoid liens being placed on his salary. In 1995, he was sentenced to a year in prison for non-payment of alimony and taxes. Paroled after four months, he undertook a new and successful stage career.

Death
He died, aged 65, from a heart attack. His autobiography, Les Pleurs du Rire (Tears of Laughter), was a major bestseller.

References

External links

1944 births
2010 deaths
21st-century French male actors
Burials at Sainte-Geneviève-des-Bois Russian Cemetery
French male comedians
French male film actors
French memoirists
French people of Georgian descent
French prisoners and detainees
French male stage actors
Prisoners and detainees of France
French people of Corsican descent
French people of Russian descent
French male non-fiction writers
20th-century French male singers